There are several lighthouses in the U.S. state of Pennsylvania.

References

 
Lighthouses
Pennsylvania
Lighthouses